大學 or 大学 (literally "university" in Chinese and Japanese) may refer to:
Daigaku (disambiguation)
Great Learning, one of the "Four Books" in Confucianism
University station (MTR), a train station in Ma Liu Shui, Hong Kong

See also
List of universities in China
List of higher education institutions in Hong Kong
List of universities in Japan
List of universities in Taiwan